Together is a six-episode 2015 television sitcom created and written by Jonny Sweet for BBC Three and set in London. It is about two twentysomethings during the early stages of a relationship. The show only has one series.

Cast
 Jonny Sweet as Tom
 Cara Theobold as Ellen
 Alex Macqueen as Ashley
 Vicki Pepperdine as Lesley
 Katy Wix as Maeve
 Sarah Daykin as Hermione

Episodes

References

External links
 
 

2015 British television series debuts
2015 British television series endings
2010s British romantic comedy television series
2010s British sitcoms
BBC romance television shows
BBC television sitcoms
English-language television shows
Television shows set in London